The Sint-Lievensmonstertoren (English: Saint-Livinus Monster Tower), also known as the Dikke Toren (or Fat Tower) is a 62 metre tall, unfinished, free standing church tower in Zierikzee, Netherlands. The accompanying church was destroyed by a fire in 1832.

In 1454 work started on a church tower, designed by Andries I Keldermans in the Brabantine Gothic style. It was planned to be, according to different sources, either 130 metres  or 204 metres tall (the latter would have made it the tallest church tower in the world by far). The work was continued by his relatives Antoon I Keldermans and Rombout II Keldermans. Work on the tower halted in 1530, when the city went through a financial crisis. The tower is now 62 metres tall, on a base of 24.5 metres by 24.5 metres. Since 1881, it is a property of the state, and it has been designated a Rijksmonument. The name doesn't refer to monsters, but to a minster.

References

Further reading
 Joost Berman (1834) Geschiedkundige beschrijving der door den hevigen brand van 6 op 7 October 1832 geheel verwoeste St. Lievens Monster of Groote Kerk te Zierikzee

External links
Information from the Zierikzee tourist site (Dutch)

Flemish art
Unfinished buildings and structures
Gothic architecture in the Netherlands
Towers in Zeeland
Rijksmonuments in Zeeland
Buildings and structures in Schouwen-Duiveland
History of Zierikzee